Pot may refer to:

Containers 
 Flowerpot, a container in which plants are cultivated
 Pottery, ceramic ware made by potters
 Pot, a type of cookware
 Pot, a 285ml beer glass

Places 
 Ken Jones Aerodrome, IATA airport code POT
 Palestinian Occupied Territories, the West Bank
 Pontefract Tanshelf railway station, England; National Rail station code POT
 Po Tat station, Hong Kong; MTR station code POT
 Patterson Office Tower, a high-rise office building located at the University of Kentucky

People 

 Cor Pot (born 1951), Dutch football manager and player
 Philippe Pot (1428–1493), Burgundian nobleman, military leader, and diplomat
 Pol Pot (1925–1998), leader of the communist Khmer Rouge in Kampuchea or Cambodia

Art, entertainment, and media 
 Pot (novel), a 1981 novel by Nejc Zaplotnik
 Pot (poker), the amount to be won in gambling
 P.O.T., former Filipino rock band
 "The Pot", a 2006 song by Tool

Computing and electronics 
 .pot, file extension for template files of gettext, the GNU localization software
 .pot, file extension for Microsoft PowerPoint template files
 Pot, a ceramic insulator supporting an electric conductor rail to provide electric traction power to trains
 Potentiometer, a variable resistor, informally known as a "pot" or "trim pot"
 POT, acronym for 'plain old telephone', a traditional phone as in plain old telephone service

Plants 
 Pot, a slang term for the drug cannabis (marijuana)
 Pot., the abbreviation for the orchid genus × Potinara

Other uses 
 (Khýtroi,  "The Pots"), the last day of the Anthesteria festival in ancient Athens
 PotashCorp, stock symbol: POT
 Pot belly, informally known as a "pot"
 Fishing pot, a trap used for fishing.
 Peaks over Threshold (POT), a method in extreme value theory in maths

See also 

 
 
 
 
 POTS (disambiguation)